Elharar [or El-harar] is a Jewish surname classically found among Moroccan Jews. Harar, "حرر", in Arabic means, "liberate". The Moroccan Arabic is different from the Arabic spoken in the Middle East. Therefore, the prefix "El" in the name Elharar is similar to the word "the" in Arabic, "ال" which is pronounced "al". Together, in Moroccan Arabic, the name Elharar means "The Liberators".

This name comes from the history of the condition of Jews living in Morocco. Pirates in the area would kidnap and then ransom off their captives. Families and communities would buy the freedom of these kidnapped individuals. The families that would buy back the kidnapped individuals were given the surname "The Liberators". Therefore, the name "Elharar".

Other derivations of the name depend on the movement of individuals but may include: Lhrar and Lehrer

Dudu Elharar (born 1945), Israeli singer and musician
Karin Elharar (born 1977), Israeli lawyer and politician

References 

Arabic-language surnames
Arab-Jewish surnames
Maghrebi Jewish surnames
Surnames of Moroccan origin